ANC is a sports multimedia and signage integration company based in Purchase, New York. 

As of 2023, C10 Media, with the founder of ANC, purchased the company back from Learfield with CEO Jerry Cifarelli, Jr. and Jerry Cifarelli, Sr. returning as Chairman. 

ANC provides signage, design, installation and advertising to sports, entertainment, retail, and transportation facilities. ANC's product and service offering includes Light Emitting Diode ("LED"), rotational, and fixed visual displays; digital media software and control systems; signage operation and maintenance; advertising marketing consultation; graphic design; and printing production.

ANC's recent projects include the Los Angeles Dodgers (most pixels per square foot in MLB); Cleveland Cavaliers (largest center-hung in the United States); Moynihan Train Hall (largest digital media network in a New York City transportation center); and Westfield World Trade Center (digital media network).

History
ANC was founded in 1997 by Jerry Cifarelli, Sr. and Alan N. Cohen, former co-owner of the Boston Celtics.

ANC acquired exclusive North American rights to Space & Time rotational signage technology in 1997 and in its first year of operations, entered into an agreement with the WNBA to provide each team with all of its rotational signage. The following year, the Company added 19 new clients who would utilize courtside and back-lit fascia rotational signage. Today, ANC partners with more than 200 teams and venues in professional and collegiate sports.

ANC formed a technology division, ANC Technologies, in 1999. ANC Technologies developed FasciaSOFT, an operating engine for LED systems, permitting the company to debut the first 360° LED fascia signage in the National Hockey League. That same year, ANC Marketing was created to provide consulting services and assist clients with marketing strategies.

ANC directed LED installations and was selected to provide ongoing operational services for digital fascia and scoreboard signage at venues such as Cleveland's Quicken Loans Arena, Minnesota's Target Center, Philadelphia's Wells Fargo Center and Toronto's Air Canada Centre from 2002 through 2006.

As part of this expansion, ANC Marketing created a national advertising sales division, including the basket stanchion arm advertising position.

During the same period, ANC debuted a new LED operating software called VisionSOFT. VisionSOFT is the first 3D interface capable of controlling multiple displays through one console, and also capable of distributing uncompressed video to its displays, eliminating distortion. The VisionSOFT application also operates DLP Digital Courtside press tables, which during the 2005-06 season became the first courtside digital signage to be approved for an NBA event.

Shortly after introducing digital courtside press tables, ANC expanded ANC Marketing into a national advertising sales division and formed a manufacturing relationship with Mitsubishi Electric. Following its new relationship with Mitsubishi, the company has completed large LED signage projects such as the Washington Nationals' new ballpark, Washington D.C.'s Verizon Center and Portland's Rose Garden.

During the 2005-06 season, VisionSOFT's application also provided DLP Digital Courtside press tables, which became the first courtside digital signage to be approved for an NBA game. A few months after introducing digital press tables, ANC expanded ANC Marketing into a national advertising sales division. ANC Sports then debuted new LED and DLP II Courtside Signage Systems in the NBA and NCAA.

VisionSOFT was selected to operate the LED display system at Pittsburgh's Consol Energy Center in 2010. ANC renovated Fenway Park with a high-definition video display system in 2011.The year has also been one of firsts as ANC installed and operated LED signage around the perimeter of a tennis court for the first time during a professional event in the United States and provided digital signage for the Dodge National Circuit Finals Rodeo in Oklahoma. ANC also collaborated with The Caesars Tribute to the Golden Age of Ice Skating held in Atlantic City, in 2010, providing the digital signage along the rim of the ice.

References

Sports companies
Companies based in Purchase, New York